The Battles of Kowang-san (22-25 November 1951) (23–24 October 1952), also known as the Battles of Hill 355, was fought during the Korean War between United Nations Command (UN) forces—primarily the Royal Canadian Regiment—and the Chinese People's Volunteer Army (PVA) at Kowang-san (Kowang mountain), it was nicknamed "Little Gibraltar" by UN troops because of its prominent size and many defensive positions.

The battle started with Canadians occupying the hilltop. A Chinese artillery assault followed by an infantry attack dislodged many of them. This was followed by an overnight Canadian artillery barrage, which had strong effect against the Chinese troops, who had not had an opportunity to find shelter, then a Canadian infantry counter-attack.

18 Canadians were killed, 35 wounded, and 14 taken prisoner, the second-highest daily Canadian casualty count in the Korean War.

Memorial
Royal Canadian Regiment commemorate this battle on 25 October (Kowang-San Day).

References

Further reading
 Stanley Arthur Ward, Royal Canadian Regiment (7 July 1932 - 23 October 1952), Korea.

Battles of the Korean War
Battles of the Korean War involving Canada
Battles of the Korean War involving China
October 1952 events in Asia
Battles and operations of the Korean War in 1952
History of Gyeonggi Province